Needhikku Thalaivanangu is a 1976 Indian Tamil-language film directed by P. Neelakantan, starring M. G. Ramachandran and Latha. It is a remake of the Telugu film Neramu Siksha (1973). The film was released on 18 March 1976 and became a box office success.

Plot 
Vijay, who lives with his uber rich parents with a pampering mother and a disappointed father, leaves home one day as his father insults him after he finds out that he, through accident during his passion for racing, has caused the death of one and blinding of another poor man. With his conscience pricking, he flees his home,  to right the wrongs before surrendering for his mistakes in front of the law unaware that his mother has already found Gopal to take the blame in return for money for his sister's marriage.

He comes across a girl, Nirmala and saves her from rapists whom he adopts as his sister unaware that she is Gopal's sister, and begins work on improving her life. Desperate to find a job, he joins as waiter to Vajravel and his daughter Vimala. Meanwhile, Sathiyamoorthy, Vijay's friend who really caused the accident and blamed it on Vijay, joins Vajravel and tries to impress Vimala. He also gets money from Vijay's mother telling her he knows where Vijay is and Vijay needs money. Vijay and Vimala fall in love but Vijay is quits the job for fear of exposure to his father.

On the other side, the family ruined by the accident has a widow, Seetha, her son and her blind brother-in-law Chinnaiya whose only motive is revenge. Vijay spends most of his earnings to help this family while the other half to support his new sister. He also plans to get Chinnaiya married to Nirmala which progress slowly. Vijay's relationship with Seetha is mischaracterized by society forcing him to don the getup of crazy beggar to help them which he uses to thrash those who mischaracterized the relationship with impunity. With Vijay's help Chinnaiya gets his vision thanks to money earned by Vijay in bike race and takes the sickle to kill Gopal who tells him that it was Vijay who did it. When looking for Vijay, they all realize that Vijay was the butler who Vimala is in love with, the beggar who helped them later, the man who helped them initially, the man who saved Nirmala among other things; they forgive him. He goes to the court who releases him as there cannot two punishment for single crime.

Cast 
M. G. Ramachandran as Vijay
Latha as Vimala
S. Varalakshmi as Maragadhan
Pushpalatha as Seetha
Roja Ramani alias Nirmala as Eswari
M. N. Nambiar as Sathiyamoorthy
V. K. Ramasamy as Vajaravel
Thengai Srinivasan as Muthaiya
V. S. Raghavan as Rajasekaran
V. Gopalakrishnan as Gopal
M. Balayya as Chinnaiya
S. V. Ramadas as the rapist at the hotel
Isari Velan as Mani, the cook
Peeli Sivam as Slum people
Ennathe Kannaiah as The collector of rent
Loose Mohan as Muthiya's sidekick
T. K. S. Natarajan as Pimp

Production 
A remake of the Telugu film Neramu Siksha (1973), Needhikku Thalaivanangu was directed by P. Neelakantan and produced by Sri Umayambikai Productions. Cinematography was handled by Thambu, and editing by M. Umanath. The costumes were designed by M. G. Naidu, the founder of Naihaa. During the filming of a sequence, Latha tripped and nearly drowned, resulting in M. G. Ramachandran reprimanding stuntman Sahul. According to the film's director Neelakandan, the climax where Ramachandran saves Latha from the cliff was shot at three different locations: Sivasamudram falls, Hogenakkal and Balamuri falls, all these were chosen by Ramachandran himself as he previously shot Chakravarthi Thirumagal in these places. The said climax which lasts for two minutes took two days to be completed while it took six days for the crew to figure out how to film this scene and make the safety preparations.

Soundtrack 
The music was composed by M. S. Viswanathan. Na. Kamarasan made his debut as lyricist with this film. The songs like "Intha Pachaikili" were well received.

Release and reception
Needhikku Thalaivanangu was released on 18 March 1976.  Kanthan of Kalki praised the cast peformances, and cinematography and called R. K. Shanmugam's dialogues as thought provoking and concluded the review saying totally it is Ramachandran's trademark. The film became a box office success and ran for over 100 days in theatres.

References

External links 
 

1970s Tamil-language films
1976 films
Films directed by P. Neelakantan
Films scored by M. S. Viswanathan
Tamil remakes of Telugu films